Michael Leslie Zandofsky (born November 30, 1965) is a former American football offensive lineman who played in the National Football League (NFL).

Early life
Zandofsky attended Corvallis High School in Corvallis, Oregon and starred in football, wrestling, and baseball.  He helped lead the Corvallis Spartans to a 3A Oregon State Championship in 1983.  He was also the 3A Oregon State wrestling champion in the heavyweight class in 1983.

College career
At the University of Washington, Zandofsky was a stand-out offensive lineman and made first-team All Pac-10 as a sophomore and a junior. In his senior year, he was a pre-season Playboy All-American.  He was selected to play in the Blue-Gray all-star game as a junior and to the East-West Shrine game as a senior.  In addition, he was awarded the John P. Angel award in his junior and senior season as the top offensive lineman on the team and was a team captain as a senior.

Professional career
He was drafted in the 1989 NFL Draft in the third round (67th overall) by the Arizona Cardinals.  In his second season in the NFL, he was sent to the San Diego Chargers, where he spent the next four seasons.  After three seasons with the Atlanta Falcons and one with the Philadelphia Eagles, Zandofsky retired from professional football.

Coaching career
Zandofsky was brought on as an assistant coach at Corvallis High School when former high school teammate Chris McGowan was hired as the Spartans head football coach in 2002.  While coaching at his alma mater, Zandofsky was the offensive and defensive line coach.  His offensive line at Corvallis has helped produce the schools top three season totals by a running back in school history in 2004, 2006, and 2009.  In 2006, Corvallis High won the 5A State Championship, the school's first since Zandofsky's senior year back in 1983.

References

1965 births
American football offensive guards
American football offensive tackles
Atlanta Falcons players
Living people
Sportspeople from Corvallis, Oregon
Philadelphia Eagles players
Phoenix Cardinals players
San Diego Chargers players
Washington Huskies football players
Players of American football from Oregon
Corvallis High School (Oregon) alumni